Assault & Flattery is Toronto's sixth and final album, released in 1984. The album features only two original band members, Anne "Holly" Woods and Scott Kreyer. Released as "Holly Woods & Toronto" which hints at Holly's increasing control and autonomy in the band at this time. The album was produced by Mike Flicker who produced five albums for Heart - the band Toronto are most often compared to. The CD release includes the bonus track "Where Are We Now?" - which was also performed by Holly herself, as a solo artist, on her CD Live It Up!.

Track listing

Side 1
 "New Romance" (Holly Knight, Anton Fig) - 3:35
 "Kerry Anne" (Holly Woods, Scott Kreyer, Mike Gingrich) - 4:43
 "Sometimes Change" (Woods, Kreyer) - 4:06
 "Look What's Showing Through" (Eddie Schwartz) - 4:41
 "Bang Your Head" (Woods, Kreyer, Gingrich, Jeff Gilhart) - 3:42

Side 2
"Desperation" (Woods, Kreyer, Paul Hanna, Daryl Alvaro, Gingrich) - 4:56
 "Assault and Flattery" (Woods, Kreyer, Tim McCauley, Gingrich) - 3:39
 "Cats & Dogs (Stealin')" (Woods, Kreyer, Gingrich) - 3:25
 "No More Cliches" (Woods, Brian MacLeod) - 4:21

CD version bonus track
"Where Are We Now?"

Personnel

Band members
Holly Woods - lead and backing vocals, co-producer
Scott Kreyer - keyboards, co-producer
Marty Walsh - lead and rhythm guitars
Mike Gingrich - bass guitar
Paul Hanna - drums

Additional musicians
Daryl Alvaro - additional guitars
Tim McCauley - additional keyboards, programming, producer
Phil Kenzie - saxophone
Lenny Castro - percussion
John Coury - backing vocals and vocal arrangements
Cele Bullard, Nick Cerro, Liz Lausanne - backing vocals
Darby Mills - vocals on the duet "Cats & Dogs (Stealin')"
Brian MacLeod - lead guitar on "Cats & Dogs (Stealin')", producer and mixing on track 9

Production
Mike Flicker - producer
Tony Bongiovi - mixing

References

1984 albums
Toronto (band) albums